Lacunicambarus diogenes, the devil crawfish, is a species of North American burrowing crayfish found in the Atlantic Coastal Plain and parts of the Piedmont ecoregion from New Jersey, Pennsylvania, Delaware, Maryland, Virginia, North Carolina, South Carolina, and Georgia.

References

Cambaridae
Freshwater crustaceans of North America
Crustaceans described in 1852
Taxobox binomials not recognized by IUCN